436 may refer to:

 436 BC
 436 AD
 436 Patricia, a large asteroid
 Gliese 436, a red dwarf star with at least one known planet
 Population 436, a 2006 film